The Betekhtin Range is a mountain range about  long, forming the southern arm of the Humboldt Mountains in Queen Maud Land. It was discovered and plotted from air photos by the Third German Antarctic Expedition, 1938–39, mapped from air photos and from surveys by the Sixth Norwegian Antarctic Expedition, 1956–60, and remapped by the Soviet Antarctic Expedition, 1960–61, and named after Soviet Academician A.G. Betekhtin.

References
 

Mountain ranges of Queen Maud Land
Humboldt Mountains (Antarctica)